This is a list of the National Register of Historic Places listings in Clay County, Minnesota.  It is intended to be a complete list of the properties and districts on the National Register of Historic Places in Clay County, Minnesota, United States.  The locations of National Register properties and districts for which the latitude and longitude coordinates are included below, may be seen in an online map.

There are 20 properties and districts listed on the National Register in the county.

History
Clay County's National Register properties reflect its significance as a transportation corridor and major agricultural region.  The Red River of the North and the Red River Trails were important early routes, but Euro-American settlement was light.  The Randolph M. Probstfield House, John Bergquist House, and Bernard Bernhardson House are the preserved homes of some of Clay County's earliest settlers.  The construction of two major rail lines in the early 1870s fuelled a great increase in population and agriculture, and cemented the importance of Moorhead as a commercial hub.  From the 1870s to the 1920s, large bonanza farms carved from railroad land grants gave way to diversified family outfits like the Wulf C. Krabbenhoft Farmstead.  The John Olness House, Solomon Gilman Comstock House, and Burnham Building are associated with individuals who prospered in land speculation and other commercial activities.

Current listings

|}

See also
 List of National Historic Landmarks in Minnesota
 National Register of Historic Places listings in Minnesota

References

External links

 Minnesota National Register Properties Database—Minnesota Historical Society

Clay County